Fruholmen Lighthouse (former name Norskholmen fyr) is a coastal lighthouse located in Måsøy Municipality in Troms og Finnmark county, Norway.  It sits on a tiny islet just off the northern coast of the island of Ingøya.

History
The lighthouse was established in 1866 and it is the northernmost lighthouse in Norway.  This is the first of the three major lighthouses that guide ships around the North Cape into the Barents Sea, and it is actually the northernmost of the three.  The original cast iron lighthouse was destroyed during World War II.

The current lighthouse was completed in 1949. The light in the lantern flashes white every 20 seconds. There is a secondary light located lower in elevation that flashes white, red or green light depending on direction, occulting three times every 10 seconds.

See also

Lighthouses in Norway
List of lighthouses in Norway

References

External links
 Norsk Fyrhistorisk Forening 

Lighthouses completed in 1866
Lighthouses in Troms og Finnmark
Måsøy
1866 establishments in Norway